Edward 'Ted' Fletcher (13 December 1925 - 13 May 2000) is a former Australian rules footballer who played with Hawthorn in the VFL.

Fletcher was used in a variety of positions during his career including the ruck and in defence. In 1953 he was appointed club captain and won the Hawthorn 'Best and Fairest' award. He retained the captaincy in the 1954 season. 

He left Hawthorn and he became Captain-coach of Sandringham in the VFA for two seasons.

Honours and achievements
Individual
 Hawthorn best and fairest: 1953
 Hawthorn captain: 1953–1954
 Hawthorn life member

References

External links

1925 births
Australian rules footballers from Victoria (Australia)
Hawthorn Football Club players
Sandringham Football Club coaches
Peter Crimmins Medal winners
2000 deaths